Andranik Migranyan (born 10 February 1949 in Yerevan, Armenia) is an Armenian-born Russian politologist, who works as a professor at the Moscow State Institute of International Relations.

Academy
He holds a PhD degree (1978) from the Institute of International Labor Movement, Soviet Academy of Sciences, Moscow. Andranik Migranyan has been a visiting fellow at Harriman Institute, Columbia University; San Diego State University. He is an author of a number of articles, books, hundreds of publications.

Advisor
During the 1990s he was an advisor to Boris Yeltsin.

From 1993 till 2000 he was a Member of the Presidential Council of the Russian Federation.

In 1994 served as Chief Advisor to the Committee on CIS Problems in the Russian Parliament (Duma). 

From 2008 to 2015 he was the director of the Institute for Democracy and Cooperation, New York, founded in 2007.

Views
In 2011, during the Libyan Civil War he said that there is a chance that Muammar Gaddafi will be imprisoned rather than sent out of the country like it happened in Egypt.

In 2013 he said that he admires Raffi Hovannisian but doesn't think he will make a good politician.

In 2014, he argued with Andrey Zubov about the role of Hitler and the Annexation of Crimea by the Russian Federation, and in an Izvestia article he stated that there was a difference between Hitler before 1939 and Hitler after 1939, and that Hitler without a single drop of blood has united Germany with Austria, and Sudetenland and Memel to Germany, something what Otto von Bismarck was unable to do.

In 2018, he called hundred thousands of protesters participating in Armenian Velvet Revolution "dirt" (охлосом, чернью, и мразью).

References

External links

1949 births
Living people
Russian political scientists
Armenian political scientists
Russian people of Armenian descent
Academic staff of the Moscow State Institute of International Relations
Members of the Civic Chamber of the Russian Federation